Anatomy of a Scene is an American television series produced by and aired regularly on Sundance Channel since 2001.  As a tagline for the series notes, each 30-minute episode "dissects the art of filmmaking" of a scene from a specific film, often a film previously showcased at a Sundance Film Festival.

An episode examines the scene from multiple perspectives, such as production design, costume design, cinematography, storyboards, writing, music, acting, and directing.  Interviews with the cast and crew are interspersed with snippets from the film.

Episodes of the show are often included on the DVD release of the films they study.

Films "dissected"  
, episodes have been produced for the following films:
American Splendor
The Anniversary Party
BAADASSSSS!
The Believer
Buffalo Soldiers
The Cat's Meow
The Clearing
Confidence
The Cooler
The Dangerous Lives of Altar Boys
The Deep End
Die, Mommie, Die!
Donnie Darko
The Door in the Floor
Far From Heaven
Frailty
Garden State
Girl with a Pearl EarringGosford Park
Hedwig and the Angry Inch
Memento
Monster's Ball
Narc
Off the Map
One Hour Photo
Prozac Nation
The Quiet American
The Rules of Attraction
Saved!
Sidewalks of New York
The Singing Detective
Stander
Tadpole
The United States of Leland
Waking Life

External links
 
 
 Sundance Making Scene, a February 2001 Cable World trade magazine article from the FindArticles website

Sundance TV original programming
2000s American documentary television series
2001 American television series debuts
2005 American television series endings
Film scenes